Arrival is an album by Jordan Rudess recorded and released in 1988.  It was released under the spelling of "Jordan Rudes".

This album is the first album to be released by Jordan Rudess.  It was released only on Cassette tape and has not been rereleased since, but can be purchased and downloaded as mp3 files from Rudess' website.

Track listing
All pieces are composed by Jordan Rudess.

Danielle's Dance – 6:35
Making Waves – 11:02
First Waterfall – 7:16
View from Above – 4:32
Soft Landing – 20:56

Personnel
Jordan Rudess - Piano, Keyboards

1988 debut albums
Jordan Rudess albums